The 2021 Russian Super Cup was the 19th edition of the Russian Super Cup, an annual football match organised jointly by the Russian Football Union and the Russian Premier League. It was contested by the reigning champions of the Russian Cup and the Russian Premier League. The match featured FC Lokomotiv Moscow, the champions of the 2020–21 Russian Cup, and FC Zenit Saint Petersburg, the winners of the 2020–21 Russian Premier League. It was played at Kaliningrad Stadium in Kaliningrad, Russia. Zenit won 3–0 with goals from Daler Kuzyayev, Sardar Azmoun and Aleksandr Yerokhin.

Teams

Venue
Kaliningrad Stadium in Kaliningrad hosted the match. Capacity has been set to 70% in line with epidemiological restrictions.

Match

Summary

Details

Notes

References

External links

Russian Super Cup
2021–22 in Russian football
FC Zenit Saint Petersburg matches
FC Lokomotiv Moscow matches
July 2021 sports events in Russia
Sport in Kaliningrad